Mark Curtis Christie (born August 8, 1953) is an American attorney who has, since 2021, been a Republican member of the Federal Energy Regulatory Commission. He was previously a judge of the Virginia State Corporation Commission, counsel to Virginia House speaker William J. Howell, and counsel to Virginia governor George Allen.

References

External links

1953 births
Living people
People from Bluefield, West Virginia
State cabinet secretaries of Virginia
United States Department of Energy officials
Georgetown University Law Center alumni
Virginia Republicans
Wake Forest University alumni